Bernhard Ilg (born in Geislingen an der Steige on February 8, 1956) is a German politician of the Christian Democratic Union (CDU). He is Mayor (Oberbürgermeister) of the Große Kreisstadt Heidenheim an der Brenz in Baden-Württemberg's region of Ostwürttemberg.

He graduated in Public management (Diplom-Verwaltungswirt) in 1980. Thereafter he was district bailiff (Kreisamtmann) at the Landratsamt of Biberach where he was in charge of finance and carrying out special tasks until 1986. From 1986 to November 28, 1999, Ilg was Mayor of Salach. He is Oberbürgermeister of Heidenheim since February 1, 2000, re-elected on November 11, 2007. In 2000, he was elected with a narrow majority; however, in 2007 he received 82.27 percent of votes. Since June 13, 2004, Ilg is also a member of the Heidenheim district county council (Kreistag).

Bernhard Ilg is also chairman of the Heidenheim public utility company, member of the board of directors of the Heidenheim Kreissparkasse (county savings bank), president of the water board of Wedel-Brenz and member of the advisory board for the programme of Radio 7. Furthermore, Ilg is president of the Stauferland tourism association and a member of Mayors for Peace.

External links 
  Official profile, City of Heidenheim

References 

Christian Democratic Union of Germany politicians
1956 births
Living people
Mayors of places in Baden-Württemberg